Edakallu Guddada Mele is a 1973 Indian Kannada-language film directed by Puttanna Kanagal. It is based on the novel of same name by Bharathi Suta which was an adaptation of the English novel Lady Chatterley's Lover by D. H. Lawrence.  and starring Jayanthi, Aarathi, Ranga, Chandrashekar, Shivaram. 

The film received 'A' certificate by the CBFC. The DVD was released with U certificate with some cuts required for recertification. However, a part of the deleted scenes created a furore when they resurfaced online in 2021. The movie was dubbed in Hindi as Prem Aur Vaasna.

Cast 
 Jayanthi as Madhavi, the captain's wife
Aarathi as Devaki, Madhavi's younger sister
 Ranga as Captain Kumar, an ex-soldier
 Chandrashekar as Nanjunda, captain's neighbor.
Shivaram as Nanjunda's uncle

Soundtrack

M. Ranga Rao composed the music for the soundtrack and the background score for the film. The lyrics for the soundtrack was penned by Vijaya Narasimha, R. N. Jayagopal, M. Narendra babu and K. Prabhakar Shastry. The soundtrack album consists of eight tracks.

See also 
Edakkal Caves
The Graduate

References

External links 
 
 http://www.raaga.com/channels/kannada/moviedetail.asp?mid=k0000956

1973 films
1970s Kannada-language films
Films scored by M. Ranga Rao
Films directed by Puttanna Kanagal
Indian drama films
Films based on Indian novels